Yass may refer to:

People 
 Catherine Yass (born 1963), painter
 Yazz, a British pop singer from the 1980s and 1990s
 Jeff Yass (born 1956), options trader, managing director and one of the five founders of the Philadelphia-based Susquehanna International
 Yoo "Yass" Sang-hoon, professional Rainbow Six Siege player for DWG KIA

Places 
 Yass, New South Wales, a town in Australia
 Municipality of Yass, original local government for the town until 1980
 Yass Valley Council, a local government area (shire) in New South Wales since 2004
 Yass Valley Way, the main road through Yass that was part of the Hume Highway before a bypass was constructed in the 1990s
 Yass River, a river in the state of New South Wales, Australia

Other uses 
 Yass (software), a genomic local alignment tool
 Yass (music), a style of Polish jazz music from the 1980s and 1990s
 Jass, a card game
 Yas (slang), a form of the word "yes" in LGBT slang